Richard Langworth may refer to:
 Richard M. Langworth, American author specializing in automotive history and Winston Churchill
 Richard Langworth (priest), English priest